Rohrendorf bei Krems (German for Tubin village by Krems) is a municipality in the district of Krems-Land in the Austrian state of Lower Austria.

Geography
Rohrendorf is located in the Waldviertel in Lower Austria. The surface of the municipality covers 9.78 square kilometers. 1.61% of the surface is wooded.

It is divided into the following Katastralgemeinden: Neustift an der Donau, Neuweidling, Oberrohrendorf, and Unterrohrendorf.

History
In 1938, during the Nazi occupation, Rohrendorf was part of the Gauhauptstadt of Krems.

Population

Politics
The mayor of Rohrendorf is Dr. Rudolf Danner. The local council has 19 members with 12 for the ÖVP, 5 for the SPÖ, and 2 for DIE GRÜNEN.

Economy and infrastructure
Most of the people here are farmers. In 2001 there were 814 employed workers.

References

External links
 www.rohrendorf.at

Cities and towns in Krems-Land District